Erandwane is a locality in Pune city. It is known for being the location of Film and Television Institute of India. It is the location for some of the most famous schools, colleges, shopping malls, restaurants, cinema halls, and hospitals in the south of Pune. Located next to Kothrud, which is home to numerous information technology companies such as Persistent Systems, Harbinger Systems, Tech Mahindra. there are numerous hostel and PG accommodations for men and women in Erandwane. Karve Road is the main road that links Erandwane with Kothrud. Marathi and English are the most commonly spoken language in the area.

Prominent Places

A prominent place to visit in the area is Kamala Nehru Park. Another place worth visiting is the Pune Fire Brigade Museum, the first of its kind in India. Also called Late Keshavrao Narayanrao Jagtap Fire Brigade Museum, the museum houses variety of equipment used by the fire department including more than 100 antique firefighting equipment including a Rolls-Royce Dennis  Also worth visiting is Dashabhuja Ganapati Temple and Joshi's Museum of Miniature Railway

Education
Erandwane is famous for FTII as well as numerous other educational institutes. The most prominent among them are listed below.
 Garware College
 S N D T Adult Education 
 Film and Television Institute of India 
 IST Institute Of Management 
 Smt. Kashibai Nawale College of Commerce
 Abhinava Vidyalaya English Medium Pre-Primary School
 The Router School
 Sinhgad School Of Gemmology & Jewellery Designing
 Sinhgad Spring Dale School
 Sinhgad Business School
 Bharati Vidyapeeth

Malls & Markets
Erandwane is known for being the location for some of the most prominent shopping malls and shops in Pune. The most prominent among them are listed below.
 Central Mall
Data Care Corporation 
Shreeganesh Computers 
Bamo Electronics 
Manoj Super Market 
Pragati Super Market 
Reliance SMART
93 Avenue

Hotels and Restaurants
Erandwane is known for being the location for some of the most famous hotels and restaurants in Pune. The most prominent among them are listed below.
 Multi Spice
 Italy Via Punjab 
 Wadeshwar Restaurant (Law College Road)
 Bhooj Adda
 Abhishek Hotel
 12 Star Garuda 
 Hotel Royalty 
 Hotel Jagannath 
 Nisarg Sea Food 
 Samudra Restaurant 
 Hotel Anand Veg 
 Kalinga Restaurant & Bar 
 Kalinga Veg Gourmet Kitchen
 Level 5 Bistro and Bar 
Incidentally design of both Level 5 Bistro and Bar and Kalinga Veg Gourmet Kitchen has been done by celebrity chef Amit Puri who has also curated the food menu; He is considered as one of the best restaurant consultants in the business.

Hospitals
There are few prominent hospitals including Multi-speciality hospital in Erandwane as listed below.
 Deenanath Mangeshkar Hospital
 ACE Hospital.
 Ameya Clinic
 Mantri Hospital
 Sagar Nursing Home
 Galaxy Hospital

See also 
 Pune
 Bhooj Adda

References

Neighbourhoods in Pune